Saaremaa VK is an Estonian volleyball club based in Kuressaare, Estonia, that competes in the Baltic Volleyball League and Estonian Volleyball League.

The team won Baltic League and Estonian Championship in their first season.

Team

2020/2021

Season by season

Honours
Baltic League
 Winners (1): 2018
 Runners-up: 2019, 2021
Estonian League
 Winners (1): 2018
 Runners-up: 2021
Estonian Cup
 Winners (2): 2018, 2019
 Runners-up: 2020

Head coaches
2017–2019  Urmas Tali
2020–2021  Ioannis Kalmazidis

References

External links
 Official website 

Estonian volleyball clubs
Sport in Kuressaare